The 2020 NCAA Division I men's soccer tournament was the 62nd edition of the NCAA Division I men's soccer tournament, a postseason tournament to determine the national champion of NCAA Division I men's college soccer. Pending developments with the COVID-19 pandemic, the first four rounds of the competition were scheduled to be held at the home ground of the higher seed, while the College Cup (semifinals and final) was to be held at Harder Stadium in Santa Barbara, California. The championship match was originally scheduled to take place on December 13, 2020.

On August 13, 2020, the tournament was postponed due to the ongoing COVID-19 pandemic, although the possibility of playing the tournament during the spring 2021 remained.

On September 10, 2020, it was reported that the 2020 NCAA Division I Men's Soccer Tournament would tentatively be rescheduled from April 30 to May 17, 2021. This was approved on September 16, 2020, with a reduced tournament field size of 36 teams. The College Cup was moved from Santa Barbara, California to Cary, North Carolina. Additionally, on March 25, 2021, the NCAA announced that the entire tournament, as well as the entire women's tournament, would be held in various locations throughout North Carolina.

Marshall won the title game 1–0 in overtime over Indiana. This was not only Marshall's first men's soccer title, but was also the first national title in a team sport won by a Conference USA member while affiliated with the league.

Qualification

Due to the ongoing COVID-19 pandemic, the 2020 edition of the NCAA Division I Men's Soccer Tournament featured only 36 teams. Of the 36 berths, 22 were allocated to the 19 conference tournament champions and to the regular-season winners of the Mid-American Conference, Pac-12 Conference, and West Coast Conference, which do not have tournaments. This included the champions of the ACC and Sun Belt, which held their conference championships in fall 2020. The additional 14 berths were at-large berths largely determined upon the Rating Percentage Index (RPI) of teams that did not automatically qualify.

Ahead of the season, the Ivy League and Big West Conference canceled their seasons, allowing for two additional at-large berths.

Qualified teams

Venues
Rather than the higher seed hosting the early-round matches, the entire tournament was played in the state of North Carolina, similar to how the 2021 men's and women's basketball tournaments were held in a single state.

Schedule
The revised schedule was announced on March 24, 2021.

Bracket

Opening Round

Bracket

Results

First round

Second round

Third round

Quarterfinals

College Cup Semifinals

College Cup Final

Statistics

Goalscorers

Records by Conference 

The R32, S16, E8, F4, CG, and NC columns indicate how many teams from each conference were in the Round of 32 (second round), Round of 16 (third round), Quarterfinals, Semi-finals, Final, and National Champion, respectively.

References

External links
NCAA Division I Men's College Cup

Tournament
NCAA Division I Men's Soccer Tournament seasons
NCAA Division I Men's Soccer
NCAA Division I Men's Soccer
NCAA Division I men's soccer tournament
NCAA Division I men's soccer tournament
NCAA Division I men's soccer tournament